Flashing Lights is the debut studio album by Australian recording artist Havana Brown. It was released on 11 October 2013 by Island Records Australia in Australia and New Zealand. The album was preceded by the singles "Flashing Lights" and  "Warrior". The album debuted at number six ARIA Albums Chart and spent five weeks in the top 50.

Background 
Brown has been recording songs since 2011 and released an EP When the Lights Go Out with singles "We Run the Night", "You'll Be Mine" and "Big Banana" all being released from the EP.

Release and promotion

Singles
The album's title track, "Flashing Lights" was released on 23 August 2013 as the album's lead single. It peaked at number 68 on the ARIA Singles Chart and number five on the US Hot Dance Club Songs chart. "Warrior" was released as the second single on 27 September 2013. It debuted on the ARIA Singles Chart at number 32 and peaked at number 11.

"Ba*Bing" was released on iTunes as the first promotional single from Flashing Lights on 13 September 2013. The song was released in November 2015 as the album's third single.

Oz Tour

Brown embarked on her Oz Tour in October 2013 which included 12 shows in Australia, Canada and the United States. The tour concluded in Brisbane on 1 January 2014.

Track listing

Charts

Weekly charts

Year-end charts

Release history

References

2013 debut albums
Havana Brown (musician) albums
Island Records albums